The Frederic Remington House is a historic house at 36 Oak Knoll Road in Ridgefield, Connecticut.  A National Historic Landmark, it was the home of the painter and sculptor Frederic Remington (1861–1909) in the last few months of his life.  Remington and his wife Eva designed the two-story gambrel-roofed, fieldstone-and-shingle house.  He produced some of his finest work in the house including the sculpture The Stampede and the painting The Love Call.  The house was declared a National Historic Landmark in 1965.

Description and history
Frederic Remington (1861-1909) lived for many years in New Rochelle, New York, working as an illustrator, sculptor, and writer.  He produced iconic works of American art, particularly noted for their themes of the American West.  His corpus of work includes more than 2,700 artworks, many of which were published in magazines and newspapers, and 142 books, including eight he wrote.  In early 1909 he and his wife purchased  of land in Ridgefield, Connecticut, and oversaw the construction of a home and studio.  During the construction, Remington continued to work, creating a number of significant works.  Although he had major plans for life in Ridgefield, he died of acute appendicitis a few months after the house was completed.

The main house is a -story gambrel-roofed wood-frame structure with a stone facade, and clapboarded sides and back.  The front has three large shed-roof dormers, and has bands of three sash windows flanking its main entrance, which is sheltered by a columned portico. The house has a central hall plan, with Remington's studio in the rear left of the structure. It is a high-ceilinged room with large windows onto the backyard, and has a large fieldstone chimney.  During Remington's life the room was cluttered with artifacts of the American West.

In addition to the main house, the property includes a cluster of outbuildings, which were also designed and built by the Remingtons.  They include a cow barn, chicken coop, and shed, as well as a caretaker's cottage and a carriage house that has been adapted for residential use.

See also
List of National Historic Landmarks in Connecticut
National Register of Historic Places listings in Fairfield County, Connecticut

References

External links

Frederic Remington
Houses in Ridgefield, Connecticut
National Historic Landmarks in Connecticut
Houses completed in 1909
Houses on the National Register of Historic Places in Connecticut
Historic American Buildings Survey in Connecticut
National Register of Historic Places in Fairfield County, Connecticut
1909 establishments in Connecticut